Eunidia flavoapicata is a species of beetle in the family Cerambycidae. It was described by Stephan von Breuning in 1939.

Subspecies
 Eunidia flavoapicata flavoapicata Breuning, 1939
 Eunidia flavoapicata tchadensis Lepesme & Breuning, 1955

References

Eunidiini
Beetles described in 1939